Daniel Armand-Delille (28 July 1906 – 8 April 1958) was a French bobsledder who competed in the early 1930s. At the 1932 Winter Olympics in Lake Placid, New York, he finished 11th in the two-man event.

References

1932 bobsleigh two-man results
Daniel Armand-Delille's profile at Sports Reference.com

Olympic bobsledders of France
Bobsledders at the 1932 Winter Olympics
French male bobsledders
1906 births
1958 deaths